The Afghan flying squirrel (Eoglaucomys fimbriatus baberi) is a subspecies of rodent in the family Sciuridae. It is endemic to Afghanistan.

Biology
The Afghan flying squirrel is not considered to be threatened to become an endangered species because it is widely distributed, it has a large population, and the population is not declining fast enough. The only threats that affect the Afghan flying squirrel are selective logging, modernization, hunting for the fur trade. It has a generation time of approximately 4 to 5 years, and it has up to two litters annually. It usually has 2 to 4 young.

Location
The Afghan flying squirrel is known to be found in montane coniferous forests.
The Afghan flying squirrel is native to the following countries:
Afghanistan
India
Pakistan

References

Notes
 Baillie, J. 1996.  Hylopetes baberi.   2006 IUCN Red List of Threatened Species.   Downloaded on 29 July 2007.
 Thorington, R. W. Jr. and R. S. Hoffman. 2005. Family Sciuridae. pp. 754–818 in Mammal Species of the World a Taxonomic and Geographic Reference. D. E. Wilson and D. M. Reeder eds. Johns Hopkins University Press, Baltimore.

Mammals of Afghanistan
Hylopetes
Endemic fauna of Afghanistan
Mammals described in 1847
Taxa named by Edward Blyth
Taxonomy articles created by Polbot